The State Theatre is a restaurant and concert venue in Falls Church, Virginia. Built in 1936, the venue operated as a movie theater until 1988. The theatre reopened in 1999 as an events hall and music theatre. The closest Metro station is the East Falls Church Metro station.

About
It was one of the first theatres on the East Coast to be air-conditioned centrally. It was the flagship of the family-owned "Neighborhood Theatres" chain which also operated: the Glebe Theater and Buckingham Theater in Arlington County, Virginia and the Jefferson Theater in Falls Church, VA.

The first film shown was Thanks a Million starring Dick Powell. On November 27, 1988, the State closed its doors after a final showing of Die Hard starring Bruce Willis. A multimillion-dollar restoration in the late 1990s turned it into a venue for live music and private events. The full theatrical stage is original, as are the 200 balcony seats and the two lobbies.

It hosted Strictly Global, a weekly music-television program for nearly seven years, from 2004 to 2011.

Noted performers

3
The AAA Girls
Animal Liberation Orchestra
Blondie
Buddy Guy
Corey Smith
Devo
Electric Light Orchestra
Gin Blossoms
Cipes and the People
Gregg Allman
Hanson
Jimmie's Chicken Shack
Jimmy Buffett and the Coral Reefer Band
Jimmy Cliff
John Mayer
Johnny Winter
Jonny Lang
Leon Russell
Mason Jennings
Mat Kearney
Monte Montgomery
Nappy Brown
Patrick Monahan
The Psychedelic Furs
Quinn Sullivan
Rata Blanca
Shooter Jennings
UFO
Wu-Tang Clan
X
Yngwie Malmsteen

References

Buildings and structures in Falls Church, Virginia
Music venues in Virginia
Theatres in Virginia
Tourist attractions in Falls Church, Virginia
1936 establishments in Virginia
Theatres completed in 1936